Escalol is the trade name of a number of UV absorbers:
Avobenzone (Escalol 517)
Oxybenzone (Escalol 567)
Padimate A (Escalol 506)
Padimate O (Escalol 507)